Kuratong Baleleng was an organized crime syndicate in the Philippines that once was an anti-communist, vigilante group. Once the largest syndicate in the country, they received nationwide attention due to their alleged end in a shootout with the Philippine National Police in May 1995 in Quezon City. The syndicate has scattered its power through members garnering political positions since then.

History 
The group was originally established by the Botanical Youth Club in 1986 to guard against the spread of communist guerrillas in Misamis Occidental, Zamboanga del Norte and Zamboanga del Sur provinces. The first leader, chosen directly by the military, was Octavio "Ongkoy" Parojinog, who allegedly used the group both for its official purpose as well as to conduct illegal activities. They were effective in driving out most of the insurgents out of these three provinces. But during peace time when the military ordered them to disband, the group instead started conducting illegal activities. The syndicate has since been involved in activities such as kidnapping, robberies, drug trafficking, and other crimes. Eventually, the group splintered into multiple, smaller groups around the region. The groups are involved in a variety of illegal activities, including robbery, smuggling, kidnapping, murder, extortion, drugs and illegal gambling. The gang is rooted in the Christian Cebuano community, but has ties to Maguindanao guerillas, which led Muslim Maguindanao clans to become members of the Kuratong Baleleng. According to military intelligence, part of the group's strength is that it is protected by both local and national government officials.

1995 PACC murder case 

In 1995, 11 members of Kuratong Baleleng were killed by the forces of the Presidential Anti-Crime Commission, led by Panfilo Lacson. Officers were prosecuted with the Free Legal Assistance Group (FLAG), the largest human rights law firm, serving as the chief prosecutor in the case. In 2003, the High Tribunal remanded the Quezon City Regional Trial Court to once again indict Lacson and 33 other police officials. The trial court dismissed the criminal case, for lack of probable cause. The special prosecuting team of FLAG led by Atty. Jose Manuel Chel Diokno responded and later asked the High Tribunal to remand the case once more to the trial court to present new evidence against Lacson, inter alia. On May 2, 2008, the Supreme Court resolved to approve the appeal thereby reopening the case to prosecute the offending officers.

Modern day
The death of Ongkoy did not spell the end of the group, however. The lawmen responsible for his death, save for the leader Colonel Gadapan, were murdered one by one. Remnants of the Kuratong Baleleng has since spread out and made claims throughout Mindanao and in other provinces, mostly in Manila and Cebu. In April 2014, a long-time Kuratong Baleleng fugitive, Edgar Digamo, was shot and killed by police after Digamo started shooting at them in Lapu-Lapu City after hiding for 13 years.

Operations set during the Philippine Drug War had weakened the Kuratong Baleleng severely. Most of the Parojinogs were either killed or captured, starting during the 2017 Ozamiz Raid. In 2018, gang leaders Manuelito Estomata Francisco, Rizalina Francisco, and June Ozamiz Francisco, were captured by the Police Regional Office 1. Efforts to revive the gang in Zamboanga del Sur was uncovered and halted, with President Rodrigo Duterte proclaiming, "There are police there in Zamboanga del Sur sort of reviving the Kuratong Baleleng… better shape up."

Depictions in popular culture
Jinggoy Estrada starred in the 1995 film Wilson Sorronda Leader Kuratong Baleleng's Solid Group depicting the life of ex-military man turned Kuratong Baleleng leader, Wilson Sorronda and the events that led to the 1995 encounter that ended Kuratong Baleleng's criminal activities.

In early 2014, the film Sa Ngalan ng Ama, Ina, at mga Anak about Kuratong Baleleng, starring actor Robin Padilla, was released.

The feature film Bamboo Dogs (2018) by Khavn (Khavn De La Cruz) is based on the Kuratong Baleleng Rubout Massacre of 1995.

References 

Philippine Drug War
Organized crime groups in the Philippines